Meletius II (died 5 January 1780) served as Ecumenical Patriarch of Constantinople during the period 1768–1769.

He was born in Tenedos. From 1750 until 1768, he served as metropolitan bishop of Larissa and then was elected Ecumenical Patriarch. During the uprising of 1769, he was dismissed and was exiled to Mytilene. In 1775, with permission of the Sultan Mustafa III, he returned to Tenedos and in 1777 to Istanbul, where he died destitute in 1780.

He was probably buried on Tenedos. In the late 20th century, his fragmentary tombstone was discovered in the garden of North Bank, a mansion in Muswell Hill, London, where it may have been taken as a souvenir in the 19th century. In 2013, the stone was returned to Istanbul, in the custody of the Ecumenical Patriarchate.

References

Sources 
 Οικουμενικό Πατριαρχείο
 Encyclopaedia Papyrus Larousse Britannica, 2007, vol. 35, p. 419

People from Tenedos
Bishops of Larissa
18th-century Ecumenical Patriarchs of Constantinople
Tenedos
18th-century Greek people